Segmentorbis is a genus of air-breathing freshwater snails, aquatic pulmonate gastropod mollusks in the family Planorbidae, the ram's horn snails.

Distribution
Distribution of Segmentorbis include Africa.

Species
Species within this genus include:
 Segmentorbis angustus (Jickeli, 1874)
 Segmentorbis kanisaensis (Preston, 1914)

References

External links

Planorbidae